State Route 331 (SR 331) is a mostly west-east, signed north-south, secondary highway in Knox County in the U.S. state of Tennessee.

Route description

SR 331 begins in Knoxville at an intersection with US 441/SR 33 (Broadway). SR 331 goes north as Old Broadway to enter Fountain City, where it has an interchange with I-640/US 25W (Exit 6) before having a partial interchange with US 441/SR 33. It then turns northeast to come to a Y-Intersection between Jacksboro Pike and Tazewell Pike, where SR 331 becomes Tazewell Pike. The highway continues northeast through suburbs before leaving Knoxville and going through farmland. SR 331 then enters Corryton comes to an intersection with SR 131 (E Emory Road), where SR 331 turns east onto E Emory Road while SR 131 turns north onto Tazewell Pike. SR 331 continues northeast to pass through downtown, where it has an intersection with Corryton Road, a major county Road that leads to Plainview and SR 144. It then leaves Corryton to continue northeast through farmland to come to an end at an intersection with SR 61 just west of Blaine.

Major intersections

References

Tennessee Department of Transportation (24 January 2003). "State Highway and Interstate List 2003".

External links
Tennessee Department of Transportation

331
Transportation in Knox County, Tennessee
Transportation in Knoxville, Tennessee